CIE may refer to:

Organizations
 Cambridge International Examinations, an international examination board
 Center for International Education at the University of Massachusetts-Amherst
 Cleveland Institute of Electronics, a private technical and engineering educational institution
 International Commission on Illumination (Commission internationale de l'éclairage)
 Companion of the Order of the Indian Empire (C.I.E.)
 Computability in Europe, an international organization of computability theorists, computer scientists, mathematicians
 CIÉ (Córas Iompair Éireann), the Irish state transport authority
 Council on Islamic Education
 Transportes Aéreos Cielos Andinos, ICAO code: CIE
 Civil Information and Educational Section (CIE), General Headquarters, the Supreme Commander for the Allied Powers in Japan (1945–1952)

Science and technology
 CIE 1931 color space, one of the first mathematically defined color spaces, created by the International Commission on Illumination (CIE) in 1931
 Commercial Information Exchange, a real estate database for commercial properties, similar to a residential Multiple Listing Service (MLS)
 Computer Interrupt Equipment, a form of discrete interrupt controller in Ferranti computers
 Congenital ichthyosiform erythroderma, a skin disease
 Control and Indicating Equipment
 Carbon Isotope Excursion, a rapid release of carbon to the ocean or atmosphere.

Other uses
 Corpus Inscriptionum Etruscarum, the known body of Etruscan inscriptions
 Cie, the abbreviation for the French compagnie or "company"